Zikanita is a genus of beetles in the family Cerambycidae, containing the following species:

 Zikanita argenteofasciata (Tippmann, 1960)
 Zikanita biocellata (Tippmann, 1960)
 Zikanita perpulchra Lane, 1943
 Zikanita plumbea Machado & Monne, 2011

References

Acanthoderini